Provincial Road 211 (PR 211) is a short provincial road in the Canadian province of Manitoba.  It provides access to Whiteshell Laboratories and the Local Government District of Pinawa in the eastern part of the province.

References

External links
Official Manitoba Highway Map

211